The 1994 UAB Blazers football team represented the University of Alabama at Birmingham (UAB) in the 1994 NCAA Division I-AA football season, and was the fourth team fielded by the school. The Blazers were led by head coach Jim Hilyer, who entered his fourth season as the UAB's head coach. They played their home games at Legion Field in Birmingham, Alabama and competed as a Division I-AA Independent. The Blazers finished their second season at the I-AA level with a record of seven wins and four losses (7–4).

Schedule

References

UAB
UAB Blazers football seasons
UAB Blazers football